Rivaldo is a masculine given name. Many football players have their name as Rivaldo. It was originally from Portugal and Brazil.

It has become popular in countries like Portugal, Brazil, Spain, Russia, USA, Argentina and Italy.

Notable people 
Rivaldo may refer to:
Rivaldo (Rivaldo Vítor Borba Ferreira; born 1972), Brazilian former footballer
Rivaldo Barbosa de Souza (born 1985), Brazilian footballer
Rivaldo Coetzee (born 1996), South African footballer 
Rivaldo Costa Amaral Filho (born 1978), Brazilian footballer
Rivaldo González (born 1987), Paraguayan footballer